The Police and Criminal Evidence (Northern Ireland) Order 1989 is a statutory instrument of the United Kingdom which instituted a legislative framework for the powers of police officers in Northern Ireland similar to the framework for the powers introduced in England and Wales by the Police and Criminal Evidence Act 1984.

Codes of criminal procedure
Laws of Northern Ireland
Statutory Instruments of the United Kingdom
1989 in British law
1989 in Northern Ireland